This is a list of destinations that Swoop has operated to . The Canadian low-cost carrier, which was founded as a WestJet subsidiary in 2017, operates to these destinations with a fleet of Boeing 737 aircraft.

List

See also
List of WestJet destinations

References

Lists of airline destinations